Tuna Oraon  was an Indian politician belonging to the Indian National Congress. He was elected to the Lok Sabha, lower house of the Parliament of India from Jalpaiguri in 1971.

References

External links
  Official biographical sketch in Parliament of India website

1931 births
Indian National Congress politicians
People from West Bengal
India MPs 1971–1977
Living people
People from Ranchi
People from Jalpaiguri district